The 2017 season was FC Seoul's 34th season in the K League Classic.

Pre-season
 In Guam: From 3 January 2017 to 21 January 2017

Pre-season match results

Competitions

Overview

K League Classic

FA Cup

AFC Champions League

Group stage

Match reports and match highlights
Fixtures and Results at FC Seoul Official Website

Season statistics

K League Classic records

All competitions records

Attendance records

 Season total attendance is K League Classic, FA Cup, and AFC Champions League combined

Squad statistics

Goals

Assists

Coaching staff

Players

Team squad
All players registered for the 2017 season are listed.

Out on loan and military service 

※ In: Transferred from other teams in the middle of the season.
※ Out: Transferred to other teams in the middle of the season.
※ Discharged: Transferred from Sanjgu Sangmu or Ansan Mugunghwa for military service in the middle of the season (registered in 2016 season).
※ Conscripted: Transferred to Sangju Sangmu or Ansan Mugunghwa for military service after the end of the season.

Transfers

Tactics

Tactical analysis

Starting eleven and formation

Substitutes

See also
 FC Seoul

References

 FC Seoul 2017 Matchday Magazines

External links
 FC Seoul official website 

FC Seoul seasons
Seoul